Bell Smith Springs Recreation Area is a National Natural Landmark designated in 1980 and located in Shawnee National Forest within Pope County, on Country Road 350E (also designated as Forest Road 848 on some maps), near Eddyville.

Description
Parking is free at two locations within the park; however, the nearby Redbud Campground has an entrance fee.

A map and overview of the features of the park is prominently displayed at the first parking turnout and trailhead. Each trail is marked with its own unique color, usually on trees alongside the trail. The trails can be moderately strenuous; the shallow creeks occasionally wash out parts of the trail and may require wading to cross. In wet weather, parts of the trail can be hazardous due to slippery rock.

Hikers wishing to see the arch from the top may climb metal bars embedded in the rock; or alternatively there is a longer walking route that winds around to the top.

Due to the abundance of water, vegetation within the park is lush. During the summer months, some of the deeper pools along the creeks are frequented by swimmers.

Wildlife includes bobcats, deer, and foxes, as well as turkeys and many other types of birds. Hunting and fishing are allowed in season with a license.

References

External links
 Official website

Hiking trails in Illinois
Natural arches of Illinois
Shawnee National Forest
Protected areas of Pope County, Illinois
National Natural Landmarks in Illinois
Bodies of water of Pope County, Illinois
Protected areas established in 1980
1980 establishments in Illinois